Muppets Tonight is an American live-action/puppet family-oriented television series created by Jim Henson Productions and featuring The Muppets. Much like the "MuppeTelevision" segment of The Jim Henson Hour (1989), the show was a continuation of The Muppet Show, set in a television studio rather than a theater.

Unlike the original Muppet Show, most episodes of Muppets Tonight featured multiple guest stars. There would usually be one principal guest, but other celebrities would make small walk-on appearances. For example, the Garth Brooks episode features a cameo from Leonard Nimoy.

It first ran on ABC from March 8 to July 14, 1996, with reruns on Disney Channel from 1997 to 1999.

Format
The premise of Muppets Tonight was that Clifford was the host of a variety/talk show on KMUP. The show stuck closely to The Muppet Show format of various skits (mostly featuring the show's human guest star) interspersed with some sort of crisis occurring backstage.

Characters

Returning Muppets

The Muppet characters performed by Frank Oz would appear intermittently on Muppets Tonight due to scheduling conflicts with his directing career.
 Clifford (performed by Kevin Clash) – Host of the show. Although he had visible eyes in this series instead of his previous sunglasses, he went back to wearing sunglasses for all of his appearances after Muppets Tonight ended. At the MuppetFest convention in 2001, Clash revealed that he disliked the visible eyes and he preferred Clifford wearing his sunglasses, refusing to perform the character again unless he was wearing them. 
 Kermit the Frog (performed by Steve Whitmire) – Producer of the show
 Animal (performed by Frank Oz)
 Zoot (performed by Dave Goelz)
 Beauregard (performed by Dave Goelz) – Janitor of KMUP
 Bean Bunny (performed by Steve Whitmire)
 Behemoth (performed by Bill Barretta) – Ernst Stavros Grouper's assistant
 Dr. Bunsen Honeydew (performed by Dave Goelz) – The scientist and inventor from Muppet Labs who shows off his inventions on the show
 Beaker (performed by Steve Whitmire) – Dr. Bunsen Honeydew's assistant
 Dr. Julius Strangepork (performed by Jerry Nelson) – Appears in a "Bay of Pigswatch" sketch as the lifeguard inspector as seen in the Pierce Brosnan episode
 Clueless Morgan (performed by Bill Barretta) – A goat who previously appeared in Muppet Treasure Island (1996); appears in the "At the Bar" sketch co-owning a bar with Polly Lobster
 The Elvises (performed by Brian Henson, Jerry Nelson, and Bill Barretta) – A group of Muppets resembling Elvis Presley that star in "Great Moments in Elvis History"
 Eugene (performed by Steve Whitmire) – A mink who serves as Nigel's assistant
 George the Janitor (performed by Steve Whitmire) – Janitor of KMUP
 Gonzo (performed by Dave Goelz) – Does his stunt shows on the show
 Fozzie Bear (performed by Frank Oz)
 J.P. Grosse (performed by Kevin Clash) – The owner of the Muppet Theater who makes cameos as a crew member. In the Sandra Bullock episode, he appears in "The Tubmans of Porksmith" as Howard Tubman's doctor (performed by Allan Trautman)
 Miss Piggy (performed by Frank Oz)
 Mulch (performed by Kevin Clash) – Dr. Phil van Neuter's assistant (shown in minor parts in earlier Muppet projects); in one sketch, it is revealed that he has a sister named Composta Heap to whom Dr. Phil van Neuter is engaged
 Polly Lobster (performed by Kevin Clash) – A lobster who previously appeared in Muppet Treasure Island; appears in the "At the Bar" sketch co-owning a bar with Clueless Morgan
 Rizzo the Rat (performed by Steve Whitmire) – Production assistant of the show
 Rowlf the Dog (performed by Bill Barretta) – Makes some appearances playing pianos in some acts
 Sam the Eagle (performed by Frank Oz) – Hosts "The Eagle's Nest"
 Andy and Randy Pig (performed by Steve Whitmire and Dave Goelz) – Two unintelligent pigs who are Miss Piggy's nephews
 Statler and Waldorf (performed by Jerry Nelson and Dave Goelz) – Usually seen heckling the show from an unnamed retirement home (season 2 has them traveling to different areas while watching the show)
 Sweetums (performed by John Henson)

New Muppets
Some of the Muppets introduced on Muppets Tonight went on to appear in later Muppet productions, particularly Pepe the King Prawn, who has become a regular.
 A. Ligator (performed by Jerry Nelson) – A pink vulture who serves as the show's announcer
 Barbershop Cactus Quartet – A group of four cacti who make up their own barbershop quartet
 Big Mean Carl (performed by Bill Barretta) – A green shaggy monster. He often uses disguises or variety acts to disguise his intentions of eating other Muppets or objects, and eats the prized pet whenever a contestant loses (or wins) Swift Wits. He also makes some audience appearances
 Bill the Bubble Guy (performed by Dave Goelz) – A blue-skinned Muppet who can make bubbles come out of his head; first appears in the Garth Brooks episode where the Head of the Network threatened to replace Clifford with Bill if Brooks did not sing one of his country songs.
 Bobo the Bear (performed by Bill Barretta) – A bear who works as a security guard
 Captain Pighead (performed by Steve Whitmire) – A pig who serves as the captain of the new Swinetrek in the "Pigs in Space: Deep Dish Nine" segments.
 Craniac (performed by Kevin Clash) – An alien with a brain for a head; a crew member on the Swinetrek in the "Pigs in Space: Deep Dish Nine" segments.
 Cue Card Monster (performed by Bill Barretta) – A small green monster with long arms who works as the cue card holder.
 Darci (performed by Leslie Carrara-Rudolph) – She was featured in "The Real World Muppets" segments
 David Hoggselhoff (a parody of David Hasselhoff; performed by Bill Barretta) – A pig who is the star of "Bay of Pigswatch"
 Dr. Pain (performed by Dave Goelz) – A doctor who appears on "E-I-E-I-O R"
 Dr. Phil van Neuter (performed by Brian Henson, assisted by Bill Barretta, operating the hands) – A mad scientist who hosts "Tales from the Vet"; in one sketch, it is revealed that he is married to Mulch's sister Composta Heap
 Ernst Stavros Grouper (a parody of Ernst Stavro Blofeld; performed by Bill Barretta) – An eyepatch-wearing grouper who is the chairman and CEO of The Grouper Group which bought out Carni-Vore Industries (the company that owns KMUP) in the episode that guest stars Don Rickles and Coolio.
 Floor Manager (performed by Leslie Carrara-Rudolph) – The unnamed floor manager of K-MUP
 Gary Cahuenga (performed by Dave Goelz) – A ventriloquist's dummy with a mind of his own
 Head of the Network (performed by Jerry Nelson) – Clifford's unnamed boss at K-MUP who first appears in the "Garth Brooks" episode wanting Clifford to get Garth Brooks to perform a country song or he will give Clifford's time slot to Bill the Bubble Guy; makes background appearances in the control room in later episodes
 Howard Tubman (performed by Bill Barretta) – A rich food-loving pig who is featured in "The Tubmans of Porksmith"
 Carter (performed by Kevin Clash) – Howard Tubman's elderly doddering butler
 Johnny Fiama (performed by Bill Barretta) – A Rat Pack-style singer (designed by Ed Eyth and built by Jane Gootnick)
 Jowls (performed by Jerry Nelson) – A wrinkly faced man who leads a house band called the Muppets Tonight Band
 Larry – A crew member at K-MUP
 Mr. Poodlepants (performed by Steve Whitmire) – An eccentric character with a strange fashion style
 Muppets Tonight Writers – A group of three monkeys who did the writing for the show as seen in the "Andie MacDowell" episode
 Nigel (performed by Brian Henson) – A green monster with a long pointy nose who serves as the show's stressed-out director
 Pepe the King Prawn (performed by Bill Barretta) – A king prawn who serves as the elevator operator and commissary cook; often paired up with Seymour; speaks with a heavy Spanish accent
 Pokey – A monster who appears in unnamed appearances in this show.
 Sal Minella (performed by Brian Henson) – A chimpanzee who serves as Johnny Fiama's flunky, bodyguard, and assistant (designed and built by Jane Gootnick)
 Seymour (performed by Brian Henson) – An elephant who serves as the elevator operator and commissary cook; often paired with Pepe
 Snookie Blyer (performed by Bill Barretta) – The host of the game show "Swift Wits"
 Snorty (a parody of Lt. Commander Montgomery "Scotty" Scott; performed by Dave Goelz) – A pig who appears in the "Pigs in Space: Deep Dish Nine" segments
 Spamela Hamderson (performed by Leslie Carrara-Rudolph) – A pig who is a spoof of Pamela Anderson. She stars in "Bay Of Pigswatch" and appears whenever a femme fatale is needed. (designed by Ed Eyth)
 Thor (performed by Brian Henson) – The God of Thunder who is seen doing everyday mundane tasks; whenever someone angered him, Thor would strike the person with lightning
 Zippity Zap (performed by Bill Barretta) – A frog who is one of the crew members on the show
 Female Rock Lobster (episode 14) – (performed by John Kennedy)
 Fairyland Police Chief  (episodes 8, 9, 13, and 17) – performed by Allan Trautman)

Recurring sketches
Among the regular sketches are:
 Bay of Pigswatch – A parody of Baywatch starring David Hoggselhoff as Champ Schwimmer, Spamela Hamderson as Spamela, and Andy and Randy Pig as Donnie and Art C. Shell where they work as lifeguards at a beach. with Guest Stars Miss Piggy And Dr Julius Strangepork.
 Carl the Big Mean... – Sketches which involve Carl doing an act, which usually ends up incorporating him eating someone or something, e.g., biting the head off a ventriloquist's puppet, predicting someone would be eaten, and eating him, as a psychic.
 E-I-E-I-O R – In a parody of ER, it features Fozzie Bear working at a hospital where the doctors and patients pass around humor; Fozzie is assisted by Dr. Pain, Ernst Stavro Grouper, and an Afghan Hound.
 Great Moments in Elvis History – In a parody of Great Moments in History, the moments in history are reenacted by a bunch of Muppet versions of Elvis Presley.
 Pigs In Space: Deep Dish Nine – In a sequel to "Pigs in Space", Miss Piggy is featured on the new Swinetrek with a different crew. The title is a spoof of Star Trek: Deep Space Nine.
 Screen Tests – A bunch of screen tests that featured the Muppets auditioning in a movie that featured the guest stars of the episodes it was featured in.
 Tales from the Vet – In a parody of Tales from the Crypt, Dr. Phil van Neuter tells scary stories revolving around animals.
 The Eagle's Nest – Sam the Eagle talks about politics and other issues with Andy and Randy Pig as his recurring guests.
 The Johnny Fiama Show – A talk show hosted by Johnny Fiama.
 NYPD Green - A parody of NYPD Blue, where crimes are investigated by Kermit as Detective Amphibowicz, at least when the network censor's not interrupting.
 The Real World Muppets – A spoof of The Real World that follows Clifford, Rizzo the Rat, Bobo the Bear, Bill the Bubble Guy, and Darci living together in one house.
 Thor: God of Thunder – Deals with Thor doing every day mundane tasks.
 UK Spots – There were some UK Spots that were in this show due to the United Kingdom version not having any commercials.
 Fairyland PD – Clifford and Bobo the Bear work as detectives at the Fairyland Police Department under the supervision of their police chief; Clifford and Bobo are charged with the duties of solving mysteries revolving around nursery rhymes and fairy tales.
 Mr. Callahan – Features the unseen Mr. Callahan who is a regular customer at a bar owned by Polly Lobster and Clueless Morgan with this sketch being at Mr. Callahan's point of view.
 Swift Wits – A game show that stars Snookie Blyer. In it, one must guess a secret word in 10 seconds to stop Big Mean Carl (in his Carl the Big Mean Bunny alter ego) from eating an adorable animal. In 5 of the 6 cases, the contestant failed spectacularly, and, on the occasion the contestant got the word correct - without clues - Carl defied Snookie to eat both the pet and then the contestant.
 The Tubmans of Porksmith – Follows the comical misadventures of a rich food-loving pig named Howard Tubman and his butler Carter (it was reworked into Boarshead Revisited in season 2).

Series run
The show ran from 1996 to 1998. There were 22 episodes produced in two batches. 13 episodes were ordered by ABC, though only ten of them were run in the 1995–96 TV season. The program was then purchased by the Disney Channel, which led a further 8 episodes and aired these along with the three episodes ABC did not air, in the 1997–98 season. One of the nine newly produced episodes was a clip show compilation culled from the earlier episodes.

In the United Kingdom only the first thirteen episodes of the show were transmitted. BBC1 screened the first 11 episodes at 7pm on Friday evenings from  6 September – 15 November 1996 with the last two going on 30th and 31st December at Lunchtimes. Sky One picked up the series in late December 1996 and continued to repeat episodes until Spring 1999.  The BBC repeated 10 episodes in late August 1999.

In Ireland the show was broadcast on TG4, eventually being dubbed into Irish Gaelic.

In Canada, the show originally aired on CBC, and later moved to Family Channel in conjunction with Disney Channel's airings.

Episodes

Season 1 (1996)

Season 2 (1997–98)

Reception
The reception from critics was mixed.

References

External links

 

1996 American television series debuts
1998 American television series endings
1990s American children's comedy television series
1990s American sketch comedy television series
American Broadcasting Company original programming
American television shows featuring puppetry
American television spin-offs
Children's sketch comedy
Disney Channel original programming
English-language television shows
The Muppets television series
Television series about television
Television series by The Jim Henson Company
TGIF (TV programming block)